United Sports (formerly known as United Sports Training Center) is a multiple-use sports complex located in West Bradford Township, Pennsylvania. The indoor venue consists of one boarded court, two boarded turf fields, and a large field house. In addition, the outdoor venue consists of four turf fields and seven grass fields. The main turf stadium seats 1,200. United Sports' outdoor facility currently plays host to youth soccer clubs FC Delco and Penn Fusion, which has produced players such as Ben Olsen, Jeff Parke, Jeff Larentowicz, Keegan Rosenberry, and Anthony Fontana among others. United Sports previously hosted the practices and training camps of the Philadelphia Wings of the National Lacrosse League and the Philadelphia Independence of Women's Professional Soccer, and was formerly home to the Philadelphia Barrage of Major League Lacrosse and the Philadelphia Pirates of the Women's Premier Soccer League.

References

External links 
United Sports Official Website
FC Delco
National Sports Center Consortium 
Penn Fusion

Sports venues in Pennsylvania
Former Major League Lacrosse venues